Marimallappa's High School, Mysore, India, was founded by Sri Gurikar Marimallappa (1818–1871) as a domestic school, the founding of which was backed by Maharaja Chamarajendra Wadiyar X. The school later became a part of Marimallappa's Educational Institution in 1876, as his legacy.

Description
The school achieved a 100% pass rate in the SSLC examinations in 2021, including a girl who scored the highest in Karnataka. The school competes with nearby Sadvidya Pathashala for the best exam results.

Subsidiaries
 Marimallappa's Higher Primary School
 Marimallappa's Pre-University College
 Marimallappa's Evening College
 Marimallappa's College of Business Management and Science
 Marimallappa Marimallamma Women's Arts and Commerce College

See also
List of Heritage Buildings in Mysore

References

High schools and secondary schools in Mysore
1876 establishments in India
Educational institutions established in 1876